Sandrich is a surname. Notable people with the surname include: 

Jay Sandrich (1932–2021), American television director, son of Mark
Mark Sandrich (1900–1945), American film director, writer, and producer